Noli Me Tángere, also known as Noli Me Tángere: The Musical, is a Filipino musical based on José Rizal's novel of the same name, with music by Ryan Cayabyab and libretto by Bienvenido Lumbera. Directed by Nonon Padilla, the musical premiered in 1995 at the Cultural Center of the Philippines (CCP) in Manila.

The musical was produced after the success of Cayabyab's previous Rizal musical adaptation, El filibusterismo (1993). Since its original production, Noli Me Tángere has been restaged multiple times, including a production in 2011 which was held to commemorate the 150th anniversary of Rizal's birth.

Casts

Television film
A television film adaptation of the musical was broadcast on December 30, 1995, on RPN (now CNN Philippines). Produced by the Film Development Foundation and directed by Jose Mari Avellana, it features Ariel Rivera and Monique Wilson in the respective roles of Crisóstomo Ibarra and María Clara; Audie Gemora, who originally played Ibarra on stage, agreed to play the role of Father Salvi instead.

References

1995 musicals
Musicals based on novels
Philippine musicals
Plays set in the 19th century
Plays set in the Philippines